Jean Albert Vincent Auguste Perdonnet (12 March 1801, Paris – 27 September 1867, Cannes) was a French railroad engineer. He published the first French textbook on railroad engineering in 1828. He also worked to investigate and remove the causes of railroad accidents.

Perdonnet's name is one of the 72 names on the Eiffel Tower.

École Polytechnique alumni
Mines Paris - PSL alumni
Corps des ponts
French engineers
1808 births
1867 deaths
Burials at Père Lachaise Cemetery
Commandeurs of the Légion d'honneur